Mulk is a 2018 Indian Hindi-language legal drama film written, produced and directed by Anubhav Sinha. The film is set against the backdrop of a Muslim family and was distributed by Zee Studios. Filmed across in Varanasi and Lucknow, Mulk stars Rishi Kapoor and Taapsee Pannu. 

The story centers around the life of a Muslim family, who tries to reclaim its lost honor after its patriarch Murad Ali Mohammed (Kapoor) gets involved in terrorism. The supporting cast of the film includes Rajat Kapoor, Manoj Pahwa, Prateik Babbar, Ashutosh Rana, Neena Gupta, Prachee Shah Paandya and Indraneil Sengupta.

Initially slated to open in cinemas on 13 July 2018, Mulk eventually released in theatres on 3 August 2018. Though failed commercially to recoup its budget, Mulk earned universal widespread acclaim for its story, screenplay, execution and cast portrayals and has been a recipient of several awards such as the Best Story and Best Film at Filmfare Awards.

Plot 
Based on a real-life story, Mulk revolves around the struggles of a Muslim joint family from a town in India, who fight to reclaim their honor after a member of their family takes to terrorism.

Murad Ali Mohammed (Rishi Kapoor), a lawyer by profession lives amiably with his family in a densely-populated diverse locality of Varanasi. His daily routine includes Namaz at a nearby mosque followed by some chit-chat over a cup of tea from a tea stall managed and owned by one of his close Hindu neighbors. His close-knit family consists of his wife Tabassum (Neena Gupta), brother Bilaal (Manoj Pahwa) who owns a mobile phone shop, brother's wife Chhoti-Tabassum (Prachee Shah Pandya), nephew Shahid (Prateik Babbar) and niece Aayat (Eshita Singh, credited as Vartika Singh). Murad's son Aftab (Indraneil Sengupta) stays abroad with his wife Aarti (Taapsee Pannu), who is a lawyer and is estranged from the family.

The story begins on the day of Murad's 65th birthday, when Aarti comes to visit them. The family enjoys a lovely night with the neighbors and friends. Another story is shown in parallel, where it is revealed that Shahid has joined hands with a terrorist organization headed by the wanted Mehfooz Alam (Sumit Kaul) who assigns Shahid with the task of a bomb blast. After the night of the anniversary celebrations, Shahid leaves early morning for Allahabad and executes the attack as planned with two other acquaintances. A lot of innocent people get killed and SSP Danish Javed (Rajat Kapoor) is assigned with the task to investigate the crime. He tracks down everyone involved with the attack, corners Shahid and finally shoots him dead as he tries to escape instead of surrendering.

Soon, police arrives at Murad's house and starts interrogating the family members. They turn the place upside down to gather evidence. As the news spreads across, people starts to flock outside Murad's house. Police takes Bilaal into custody for further interrogation. Aarti steps up as the defense lawyer for Bilaal and escorts him to police station. Danish interrogates Bilaal for over 17 hours but gets no useful information.

Within a matter of hours, the situation around Murad's neighborhood changes drastically. Everyone whom Murad had known for decades starts looking at him as a terrorist. His life's reputation and goodwill gets shattered in a day. Bilaal is taken to court for hearing and the judge Harish Madhok (Kumud Mishra) denies his bail and grants police custody of him for 7 days for further interrogation. After postmortem, police brings Shahid's body to hand it over to Murad, but he refuses to accept. Despite him strongly condemning Shahid's act, situation worsens around Murad's neighborhood where people tag his entire family as terrorists trying to shame them in every possible way. Stones get pelted inside the house and "Go back to Pakistan" gets written on their boundary wall. On the other hand, some of the Muslims with extremist mindset approach Murad and try to convince him that Shahid has sacrificed his life in the name of Jihad. He is a true martyr and all the Muslims should appreciate his act and rise up against Hindu dominant society which Murad strongly opposes. Despite everything, the family maintains their compose and relies on legal procedures to get their names cleared.

As the legal proceedings begin after 7 days, public prosecutor Santosh Anand (Ashutosh Rana) tries to convince the court that this act of Shahid is not a standalone incident but an eye opener about how Muslims are breeders of terrorists. He argues that every single member of Murad's family was aware and supportive of Shahid's action and his home was the den of terrorist operations. As evidence, he presents Shahid's laptop which has detail procedure of how to make bombs, a transmitter which was installed at Murad's home to communicate with the terrorists via private frequencies, CCTV footage of Bilaal giving lift to Mefooz Alam and him selling SIM cards to terrorists without asking for any valid documents. Based on all these facts, he requests the judge to consider Murad also as a person of interest in this case and remove him as Bilaal's defense lawyer. The court agrees, Murad has to step down and Aarti takes his place as the main lawyer for this case.

With things turning against him at court, Bilaal, who is already tired, ashamed, confused, saddened, tortured and humiliated, suffers a massive heart attack and passes away on his way to the hospital. Murad's family again suffers another setback and now everything comes down to Aarti to get her father-in-law and his family acquitted of all the charges that were laid upon them on the basis of mere prejudice.

Aarti tries to justify in court that there is no evidence against any of the family members except Shahid that they were involved with terrorism. Shahid was the only person who knew how to operate a laptop and the transmitter was installed by him under the excuse to boost cable TV signal. Since he had access to Bilaal's mobile shop he only took those SIM cards without any document and used those to communicate with the terrorists. Bilaal had no idea who Mehfooz Alam was and so when he came to meet Shahid, he assumed him to be his friend and offered him a drop at the railway station since he was also heading in the same direction. Aarti also argues that it has become a mindset of people to consider all Muslims as terrorists and someone just by growing a beard or practicing Islam becomes a terrorist in public eye. Just because of this established taboo about Muslims, Murad and his family is going through this horrible trauma and humiliation which even claimed Bilaal's life.

Public prosecutor Santosh Anand fails to produce any further evidence and the court concludes that all evidences against Murad and his family are circumstantial thereby dropping all charges against them. Judge Harish Madhok dismisses the case stating that the main problem is with people's mentality and everyone irrespective of their religion should fight against it to bring a change.

The movie ends with giving it's viewers the moral that we should change our way of thinking from "Us and Them" to "We".

Cast
Rishi Kapoor as Advocate Murad Ali Mohammed
Taapsee Pannu as Advocate Aarti Malhotra Mohammed, Murad's daughter-in-law
Rajat Kapoor as SSP Danish Javed
Ashutosh Rana as Public Prosecutor Santosh Anand
Manoj Pahwa as Bilal Ali Mohammed, Murad's brother
Prateik Babbar as Shahid Ali Mohammed, Murad's nephew
Neena Gupta as Tabassum Ali Mohammed, Murad's wife
Kumud Mishra as Judge Harish Madhok
Prachee Shah Pandya as Tabassum Ali Mohammed/Choti Tabassum/Tabassum 2, Murad's sister-in-law
Eshita Singh (credited as Vartika Singh) as Aayat Ali Mohammed, Murad's niece
Ashrut Jain as Rashid
Indraneil Sengupta as Aftab Ali Mohammed, Murad's son
Sumit Kaul as Mehfooz Alam
Ratnakar Upadhayay as Nayan Tejwani
Abdul Quadir Amin as Riyaz
Mahesh Chandra Deva as ats officer Bhadhohi
Varun Tamta as SP Somnath Mishra

Production

Development

A newspaper report read by Anubhav Sinha became the point of origin of Mulk and prompted him to develop an idea which he shared with his friends for their feedback. After receiving a positive response from his friends he began scripting the film. After writing 13-14 drafts of the film, Anubhav began narrating the story to his friends in the film industry, one of them being director Shoojit Sircar. Shoojit found the story to be one of the best-written works of Anubhav and requested him to not reconsider this project and instead go ahead with it.

The actors were given a preparation time of three months to get familiar with the roles they were playing. Prateik Babbar, who was to play the role of a Muslim terrorist was asked to watch the documentary Among the Believers and read extensively about David Headley, who is an American terrorist of Pakistani origin. For an appropriate portrayal of courtroom proceedings, Tapsee Pannu and Ashutosh Rana who play defence lawyer and public prosecutor respectively in the film were provided guidance by retired High Court Judge Nadeem Siddiqi from Lucknow for their courtroom sequences. A religious Muslim scholar from Malihabad was called in to supervise the Muslim rituals involving Rishi Kapoor in the film. Jashoda Madhavji supervised the film's public relations.

Casting

In July 2017, it was reported that Rishi Kapoor, Taapsee Pannu and Prateik Babbar had been signed by Anubhav Sinha for his next film called Mulk. In September 2017, Neena Gupta was cast as the wife of Murad Ali. In August 2017, Neena Gupta had put up a post on her Instagram account saying that she was looking for good quality work, and as a response to that post director Anubhav Sinha got in touch with her and offered her a role in his film Mulk. Twelve actors from the Lucknow theatre industry were signed on to do various roles in the film. Eshita Singh, daughter of AAP leader Sanjay Singh and a member of Asmita Theatre Group, was added to the cast, but was credited as Vartika Singh. On 26 September 2017, it was reported that actor Ashutosh Rana would be working with Anubhav Sinha in his next film Mulk, 25 years after Shikast which was the last time the two of them worked together. Initially, Rajat Kapoor was supposed to play the role of Rishi Kapoor's brother and actor Manoj Pahwa was assigned the role of Police Officer Danish Javed but after the arrival of the two actors on set, Anubhav realized that both actors should be playing different roles and not the ones assigned to them, and as a result of that Rajat and Manoj swapped each other's roles.

Filming

Principal photography of the film began in October 2017 in Lucknow and continued for the next 27 days. According to the director Anubhav Sinha, Lucknow has been shown as Varanasi in the film while some part of the movie was also shot in Varanasi for two days. The filming process was completed on 9 November 2017.

Soundtrack 

The background score of the film is composed by Mangesh Dhakde and songs are composed by Prasad Sashte and Anurag Saikia. The lyrics are written by Shakeel Azmi.

Release

The movie was released on 3 August 2018 in 800 cinemas in India. The teaser of the film was out on 28 June, and official trailer was released on 9 July.

Controversy

After banning the trailer of the movie in Pakistan, the Central Board of Film Censors, Pakistan banned the movie as well on 3 August 2018. Reacting to the decision, director Anubhav Sinha wrote a letter to the citizens of Pakistan.

However, Danyal Gilani, the Chairman of  the Central Board of Film Censors, Pakistan said, "Members of the CBFC unanimously decided not to approve the trailer of Mulk as its contents flout the Censorship of Film Code, 1980, but the movie hasn't been banned  as the film is yet to be submitted to the board for review,"  as reported by The Express Tribune, Pakistan.

Critical Reception

India 
Mulk received highly positive response from critics in India. Taran Adarsh, movie critic and business analyst from Bollywood Hungama, wrote the following on Twitter about the movie, "#Mulk stands on powerful writing + splendid performances... Rishi Kapoor is in terrific form... Taapsee is fantastic... Supporting cast adds strength... Manoj Pahwa, Ashutosh Rana, Rajat Kapoor, Kumud Mishra, Prateik Babbar and Prachee Shah Paandya, each actor excels." Shekhar Gupta praised the film stating that Mulk breaks that mould and has ordinary Indian Muslims look you in the eye, as 1 out of 7 of Indians is a Muslim.

The Indian Express while giving 3.5 out of 5 carried the following line, "Any film that does not demonize, that talks of peace and brotherhood, in these dark, cynical times, is to be lauded. Mulk is Anubhav Sinha’s best film, and it concerns us all." In similar views, Firstpost also rates the movie 3.5 out of 5 and states, "More than a film, Anubhav Sinha's Mulk is a voice. It is the voice of a section of Indian society working tirelessly to get rid of the prejudice around a certain community in the contemporary world."

On the other hand, The Times of India gave the film 4 out of 5 and opined, "Mulk focusses on some hard-hitting and burning issues, while also highlighting the crucial role that the media and various other channels of information play in disseminating the right news and facts to its citizens. It also brings to fore the other horrifying faces of terrorism which often gets brushed under the carpet. Mulk is a film that’s relevant, brave and is a must-watch. It has thought-provoking message which drives home the point – that being a true Indian and real patriot is about embracing people from every faith with an open heart." Additionally, NDTV also gave the film 4 out of 5 and commented, "Go watch Mulk for its stout-hearted espousal of sanity. It isn't often that Bollywood shows such spine." Similarly, the critics at Filmfare rated the movie 4 out of 5 and writes, "The film makes you see these dark truths and you can't help but nod."

Meanwhile, News18 gave the film 3 out of 5 and the article in its closing lines read, "Finally, Mulk isn’t original cinema, it’s not even its own film, but it’s a much needed reminder and lesson that we live in a secular nation, something that we always strive for."

Overseas 
Khaleej Times, a daily English language newspaper published in United Arab Emirates, rates the film 3 out of 5 and states, "'Mulk' dares to tell a story not many filmmakers might want to associate themselves with. The one who emerges as a hero is the script, strong performances, and Anubhav Sinha's conviction to tell us the story. 'Mulk' is a fearless, courageous film and deserves to be watched."

Awards and nominations

References

External links
 Official trailer at YouTube
 
 Mulk at Koimoi
 
 

2018 films
Hindi-language drama films
Indian drama films
Indian courtroom films
2010s Hindi-language films
2018 drama films
Films directed by Anubhav Sinha
Films about Islam
Films about Islamic terrorism
Films about jihadism
Fictional portrayals of the Uttar Pradesh Police
Films about social issues in India
Films about terrorism in India